Final Round may refer to:

 Final round, the last stage of a tournament 
 Final Round (Code Lyoko), an episode of Code Lyoko
 An annual fighting game tournament held in Georgia since 1997:
 Final Round 19
 Final Round 20
 Final Round 21

See also

 The Final Round, a boxing-themed video game released by Konami in 1988 and re-released by Taito in 2001